Delphine Menant (1850–unknown) was a French explorer and ethnologist.

Life 
Delphine Menant was born in 1850. She was the daughter of the famous orientalist Joachim Menant and a pupil of James Darmesteter.

In 1900, she was sent as an attaché at the Guimet Museum to india to study the  Parsis.She left with both her mother and a servant and arrived in Bombay in October 1900. She then studied the Parsis, their familial and political life, their education, hospitals, religion, and funerary rites. Then on 18 December, she  travelled by train to visit Gujarat and study the Parsi communities there. She stayed in Umargam and Nargol as well as Sanjan and Navsari.

At the beginning of January 1901, she visited Bharuch before leaving for Baroda, where she stayed with the Maharaja of Baroda. Injured in a car accident, she spent three weeks recovering in hospital in Surat. In Surat she also met the family that housed Anquetil-Duperron (from 1758 to 1761), the first European translator of the sacred book of Parsis, the Zend-Avesta.

Publications 
 Les Parsis, histoire des communautés zoroastriennes de l'Inde, Ernest Leroux, 1898 
 Rapport sur une mission scientifique dans l'Inde britannique, 1902
 Note de Mademoiselle Delphine Menant sur les différentes cérémonies du culte mazdéen, présentée par Georges Perrot, Comptes rendus des séances de l'Académie des Inscriptions et Belles-Lettres, vol. 46, 1902,  
 Sacerdoce zoroastrien à Nausari, 1912

Bibliography 
 Numa Broc, Dictionnaire des explorateurs français du XIXe siècle, T.2, Asie, CTHS, 1992,

References

External links 

 

French ethnologists
1850 births
French Iranologists
French Indologists
Zoroastrian studies scholars
Year of death missing
French expatriates in India